Richard de Vernon, Lord of Nether Haddon, was an English noble.

Life
Richard was the son of Richard de Vernon and Margaret de Vipont. He died in 1329.

Marriage and issue
He married, firstly, Alianore, daughter of Giles de Frenes of Pitchcott. She died without issue.

Secondly, he married Juliana, daughter of William de Vesci and Agnes de Ferrers. They are known to have had the following known issue:
Richard de Vernon (died 1322), married Matilda (Maud) Camville, had issue.

Citations

References
 
 

14th-century English people
Year of birth unknown
1329 deaths